Semiotus furcatus is a species of beetle in the family Elateridae.

Description
The basic colour of the body is reddish-orange. The pronotum has a single longitudinal median black stripes, while the elytra have three black stripes.

Distribution
This Neotropical species occurs from Panama to Peru, including Bolivia and Brazil.

References

Elateridae
Beetles of South America
Beetles described in 1792